Frigyes Barna (27 February 1896 in Budapest - 31 January 1958 in Kitzbühel) was a Hungarian ice hockey player.

References

External links

1896 births
1958 deaths
Ice hockey people from Budapest
Ice hockey players at the 1928 Winter Olympics
Olympic ice hockey players of Hungary